Guido Brunetti is a fictional Italian detective, created by Swiss/American writer Donna Leon.
He is a commissario (detective superintendent) in the Italian State Police, stationed in Venice and a native of that city.  Brunetti is the subject of (as of 2022) 31 novels: He is also the subject of a German TV film series based on these novels.

Depiction
Brunetti is described by Leon in her first novel, Death at La Fenice, as "a surprisingly neat man, tie carefully knotted, hair shorter than was the fashion; even his ears lay close to his head, as if reluctant to call attention to themselves. His clothing marked him as Italian. The cadence of his speech announced he was Venetian. His eyes were all policeman".
He is portrayed as honest, intelligent and diligent in his work. He is happily married to Paola, a university lecturer, and has two children, Raffaele (16) and Chiara (13). He is well-educated (with the title dottore) having read classics at university, and speaks English well, from working in the USA for a period.
He is by turns philosophical, intelligent and compassionate, but also pragmatic, with "native skills of subterfuge, trickery and deceit". 
Arminta Wallace of the Irish Times has suggested that Brunetti is the antithesis of a crime-fiction stereotype; unlike the typical “shambolic, hard-drinking, over-worked policeman”, he is “presentable and well-read. He gets home for dinner” and he “seems to enjoy the company of his wife Paola and their kids”.

Brunetti is assisted by a Detective Sergeant (later Inspector), Lorenzo Vianello, and by the station secretary, Elettra Zorzi, though he has a difficult relationship with his superior, Vice-Questore Giuseppe Patta.

List of characters
Some recurring characters from the Brunetti novels.

Colleagues
Lorenzo Vianello, introduced in the second novel, Death in a Strange Country, is a detective sergeant and Brunetti's usual assistant. He is older than Brunetti, stolid and dependable. Later in the series he is promoted to Ispettore (detective inspector)
Elettra Zorzi (referred to as "signorina Elettra") is the Questura secretary. An able and intelligent woman, she was introduced in the third novel, The Anonymous Venetian, and quickly became indispensable to the running of the department. She readily assists Brunetti through her computer skills and range of contacts; he describes her as "a woman of endless and instinctive deceit".
Giuseppe Patta, the station's Vice-Questore, is Sicilian, a vain, bombastic, and (by turns) idle or dictatorial man. Brunetti has an awkward relationship with him, and this opinion is shared by the others; in Fatal Remedies we see signorina Elettra running a surreptitious game of Bingo, based on Patta's use of jargon during staff briefings
Ettore Rizzardi, the Medical Examiner, a skilled and conscientious physician.

Family
Paola Falier, Brunetti's wife, a university lecturer in English Literature (like Donna Leon herself)
Raffaele ("Raffi") their son
Chiara, their daughter
Orazio Falier, Brunetti’s father-in-law, Paola’s father

Novels
Commissario Brunetti is the subject of numerous novels.

 Death at La Fenice (1992) - The celebrated opera house, La Fenice, has seen its share of death, but none so horrific or violent as that of 'maestro Helmut Wellauer, poisoned during a performance of La Traviata. Even Brunetti is shocked by the number of enemies Wellauer has made on his way to the top- but how many have motive enough for murder?
 Death in a Strange Country (1993) - Early one morning Brunetti is confronted with the body of a young man fished out of a fetid canal. All clues point to a mugging, but robbery seems too convenient a motive. Then something incriminating is found in the dead man's flat, which points to the existence of a high level cabal, and Brunetti becomes convinced that somebody is taking great pains to provide an easy solution to the crime
 The Anonymous Venetian (1994) a.k.a. Dressed for Death - Brunetti's hopes of a family holiday are dashed when a gruesome discovery is made; a body so badly beaten to be unrecognizable. Brunetti searches Venice for someone who is able to identify the body but is met with a wall of silence. Then a call from a contact promises some tantalizing information, but before the night is out he is confronted with yet another appalling and apparently senseless death
 A Venetian Reckoning (1995) a.k.a. Death and Judgment - A truck crashes on one of the treacherous mountain roads in the Italian Dolomites, spilling a terrible cargo.  Meanwhile, a prominent international lawyer is found dead in the carriage of an intercity train at Santa Lucia.  Can the two tragedies possibly be connected?  Commissario Guido Brunetti digs deep into the secret lives of Italy's elite classes to find the answer.
 Acqua Alta (1996) a.k.a. Death in High Water - As Venice braces for a winter tempest and the onslaught of acqua alta – the rising waters from torrential rain – Commissario Guido Brunetti finds out that an old friend has been savagely beaten at the palazzo home she owns and shares with her frequent guest and life-partner, the reigning diva Flavia Petrelli.
 The Death of Faith (1997) a.k.a. Quietly in Their Sleep<ref>{{cite book|author=Leon, Donna|publisher=Pan Books|title=The Death of Faith (a.k.a. Quietly in Their Sleep)|url=https://archive.org/details/deathoffaith00leon|isbn=9780330349499|date=1997}}</ref> - Brunetti comes to the aid of a young nursing sister who is leaving her convent following the unexpected death of five patients.  At first, Brunetti's inquiries reveal nothing amiss, and he wonders whether the nun is simply creating a smoke screen to justify abandoning her vocation.  But perhaps, she has stumbled onto something very real and very sinister – something that puts her life in imminent danger.
 A Noble Radiance (1997) - The new owner of a farmhouse at the foot of the Italian Dolomites is summoned to the house when his workmen disturb a macabre grave.  Once on the job, Brunetti uncovers a clue that reignites an infamous cold case of kidnapping and disappearance involving one of Venice's oldest, most aristocratic families.
 Fatal Remedies (1999) - For Commissario Brunetti, it began with an early morning phone call.  In the chill of the Venetian dawn, a sudden act of vandalism shatters the quiet of the deserted city.  But Brunetti is soon shocked to find that the culprit waiting to be apprehended at the scene is someone from his own family.  Meanwhile, he is under pressure from his superiors at work to solve a daring robbery with a link to a suspicious accidental death.  Does it all lead back to the Mafia?  And how are his family's actions connected to these crimes?
 Friends in High Places (2000) - Commissario Brunetti is visited by a young bureaucrat investigating the lack of official approval for the construction of Brunetti's apartment years before.  What began as a red tape headache ends in murder, when the bureaucrat is later found dead after a mysterious fall from a scaffold.
 A Sea of Troubles (2001) - The murder of two clam fishermen off the island of Pellestrina, south of the Lido on the Venetian Lagoon, draws Commissario Brunetti into the island's close-knit community, bound together by a code of loyalty and a suspicion of outsiders. When Signorina Elettra volunteers to visit the island, where she has relatives, Brunetti finds himself torn between his duty to solve the murders, concerns for Elettra's safety, and his not entirely straightforward feelings for her.
 Willful Behaviour (2002) - When one of his wife Paola's students comes to visit him with an interest in investigating the possibility of a pardon for a crime committed by her grandfather many years ago, Commissario Brunetti thinks little of it, beyond being intrigued and attracted by the girl's intelligence and moral seriousness.  But when she is found stabbed to death, Claudia Leonardo is suddenly no longer simply Paola's student, but Brunetti's case.
 Uniform Justice (2003) - Brunetti faces an unsettling case when a young cadet has been found hanged, a presumed suicide, in Venice's elite military academy.  As he pursues his inquiry, he is faced with a wall of silence and finds himself caught up in the strange and stormy politics of his country's powerful elite.
 Doctored Evidence (2004) - A wealthy elderly woman is murdered. Soon afterward, her Romanian maid is hit by a train while trying to leave Italy with a large amount of money and forged papers. The case appears to be solved. Then, a neighbour provides evidence that the maid was not guilty of the murder. Brunetti digs further into the case, though officially it is closed, and finds that greed was not the motive behind the killing.
 Blood from a Stone (2005)- Shortly before Christmas, a man is killed in Venice's Campo Santo Stefano.  An illegal immigrant, presumably from Senegal, he is one of the vu' cumprà who sell fake fashion accessories while trying to stay ahead of the law.  At first, the crime seems like a simple clash between rival vendors, but as Commissario Guido Brunetti probes more deeply, he begins to suspect that this murder was the work of a professional and there was more to the victim's story than met the eye.  And why does his boss want him off the case?
 Through a Glass, Darkly (2006) - When the body of a night watchman is found in front of a blazing furnace at De Cal's glass factory along with an annotated copy of Dante's Inferno, Brunetti must investigate.  Does the book contain the clues Brunetti needs to solve the murder and uncover who is ruining the waters of Venice's lagoon?
 Suffer the Little Children (2007) - One night, a group of men break into the apartment of a pediatrician and his wife, violently assaulting the doctor and terrifying his wife and baby. They claim to be carabinieri. Brunetti investigates and is drawn into a murky world of unethical medical practice, corruption, and babies for sale to those with the money.
 The Girl of His Dreams (2008) - One rainy morning Commissario Brunetti and Ispettore Vianello respond to an emergency call reporting a body floating near some steps on the Grand Canal. Reaching down to pull it out, Brunetti’s wrist is caught by the silkiness of golden hair, and he sees a small foot. Together, he and Vianello lift a dead girl from the water.
 About Face (2009) - At a party, Brunetti meets a charming, well-read young woman with a garish facelift. At work, Brunetti is assigned to cooperate with a carabiniere investigating the murder of a man involved in illegal trucking of hazardous waste for the Camorra. Then, the two stories converge.
 A Question of Belief (2010) - Brunetti learns of a curious pattern at the courthouse: cases involving a certain judge and usher are repeatedly postponed in a way that benefits a certain lawyer. What's more, the usher is leasing an apartment from the lawyer at an extremely low rent — until he is murdered.
 Drawing Conclusions (2011) - An elderly woman dies of an apparent heart attack in her apartment. But could it be because someone shook her? If so, who and why? Brunetti explores the labyrinth of her recent activities, and arrives at a secret society for protecting battered women and a massive case of fraud committed many years before. 
 Beastly Things (2012) - A man whose body is found floating in a canal turns out to be a veterinarian who has been moonlighting as inspector for a slaughterhouse. Could something he learned there have led to his murder? Brunetti investigates, in one of Donna Leon's best-constructed and most atmospheric stories.
 The Golden Egg (2013) - A young man, said to be deaf-mute and developmentally disabled, dies of an apparently accidental dose of sleeping pills. It isn't reported as a crime, but Brunetti and his wife Paola have known him in the neighborhood, and Brunetti can't help enlisting his police force friends to pull on the thread, until the whole gruesome past is unravelled.
 By Its Cover (2014) - Someone is cutting pages out of precious rare library books, and Brunetti investigates. The obvious culprit has disappeared. Then an ex-priest who was in the library at the same time is murdered.
 Falling in Love (2015) - Diva Flavia Petrelli is back, performing as Tosca. Someone has been sending her extravagant flowers and a valuable necklace. Then a singer whom Flavia complimented is pushed down some stairs, and her landlord, an ex-boyfriend, is stabbed. Can Brunetti protect Flavia from this violent stalker?
 The Waters of Eternal Youth (2016)
 Earthly Remains (2017)
 The Temptation of Forgiveness (2018)
 Unto Us a Son Is Given (2019)
 Trace Elements (2020) - A woman in hospice reaches out to the Venice police regarding the motorcycle death of her husband, an employee at an environmental water testing company.  Commissario Brunetti along with Commissario Claudia Griffoni bring their complementary investigatory skills to tackle this case.
 Transient Desires (2021)
 Give Unto Others (2022) Set in the Covid pandemic, this tale starts with Guido doing a favor for a long-ago acquaintance, which leads to discoveries of various forms of tax fraud and deceit, and has Brunetti questioning his motives.
 So Shall You Reap'' (2023)

Television series
Trebitsch Productions has adapted the first 26 Commissario Brunetti novels for German television for ARD's Degeto Film division, although the characters and plot details in the adaptions differ from those in the source material. Until episode 13, the films didn't even come out in the same order as the books. Joachim Król has depicted Guido Brunetti from 2000 – 2002 and Uwe Kockisch from 2003 - 2019. Although there are more books, the series is not continued after 26 episodes.

Footnotes

References

External links
 Guido Brunetti at famous-detectives.com; retrieved 28 June 2018

Series of books
Mystery fiction bibliographies